The Future is Wild is an animated adventure television series based on Canadian 2003 joint Animal Planet/ORF (Austria) and ZDF (Germany) co-production The Future is Wild, developed by Nelvana, Teletoon and IVL Animation, in association with Discovery Kids and directed by Mike Fallows, with characters and creatures designed by Brett Jubinville. It is made in CGI animation.

The show follows four teenagers (CG, Luis, Emily and Ethan) who study the future of the Earth to find a new habitat for humanity, while learning about the futuristic creatures who inhabit it. The show ran for one season with 26 episodes. It utilizes creatures speculated about in the original version of The Future is Wild, albeit with highly fictionalized elements.

Plot

10,000 years in the future, humanity is threatened by a mega ice age. Cassiopeia G. (nicknamed C.G. or "Ceeg" by her friends) is sent on a time machine called the "Timeflyer" to find a new habitat for humanity. While in the Northern Forest, a creature known as a "Squibbon" has stowed away on the Timeflyer, accidentally transporting C.G. to the 21st Century. Once there, C.G. is greeted by three teenage friends: Ethan, Emily, and Luis. The three they accompany her on her mission.

Reception

The show has garnered strong ratings on both the American and Canadian partners of Discovery Kids, leading to worldwide distributions, including the United Kingdom, Russia, Germany, Portugal, Romania, Turkey, Hungary, Poland, Ukraine and the Middle East. Episodes are also available on certain airlines and online.

In 2008, it was nominated for an Artios award for 'Outstanding Achievement In Casting', and Marc Donato was nominated for a Young Artist Award for Best Performance In A Voice-Over role.

In 2009, Mike Fallows was nominated for a Daytime Emmy Award for Best Direction in a children's series.

In 2009, Steve Sullivan was nominated for a Daytime Emmy for Outstanding Writing In A Children's Series for his work on the show.

The show was also nominated for a Daytime Emmy for Best Sound in a children's series.

Characters

Episodes

Broadcast
The series aired on Discovery Kids and premiered in the United States on October 13, 2007. The final episode aired on July 5, 2008. After the series ended, reruns continued to air on The Hub until June 24, 2012.

In Canada, the show first aired on Teletoon on June 28, 2010; In October 2016, Teletoon still aired the show on weekdays at 10:30pm EST, but they eventually took the show off the channel's schedule. The show hasn't been seen in Canadian television since then. The entire series is now streaming on Tubi and Amazon Prime.

References

External links
 

2000s Canadian animated television series
2000s Canadian science fiction television series
2007 Canadian television series debuts
2008 Canadian television series endings
Animated television series about animals
Canadian children's animated action television series
Canadian children's animated adventure television series
Canadian children's animated drama television series
Canadian children's animated science fiction television series
Canadian computer-animated television series
Canadian time travel television series
English-language television shows
Evolution in popular culture
Singaporean animated television series
Teen animated television series
Teletoon original programming
Television series by Nelvana
Television series set in the future
Television shows set in Toronto
Discovery Kids original programming
2000s Canadian time travel television series